Sunampur is a village located in Golapganj Upazila, Sylhet District, Bangladesh.

The village has 5 mosques, 2 schools, 3 madrasha (Islamic schools), 2 Eid Ghah (Islamic EID prayer place), and 3 cemeteries.

Two rivers flow through the village, Kushiyara River on the north and Radha Jhuri / Khora Nodi on south. Other villages around Sunampur include Chondorpur to the north, Islampur to the west, Ahmedpur to the east and Raihghor to the south.

References

Golapganj Upazila
Populated places in Sylhet District